Boitsfort Rugby Club is a Belgian rugby union club currently competing in the Belgian Elite League.

The club is based in Brussels suburb of Boitsfort in the Brussels Capital Region.
The official colours of the club are blue and white.

History
The club was founded in 1970 and has won the Belgian Elite League title on sixteen occasions most recently in 2010 and have won the league on twelve occasions.

In the 2011/12 season they finished the regular season in third place. They are one of the most successful clubs in Belgian Rugby history having dominated the league since 1990.

As from the 2018/2029, a third squad (the “BRC3”) has been introduced in the last division championship.  Gathering veterans members having played at the highest level before getting older and sports enthusiasts of the same generation (known as the “XV Cors”), it also includes newer players and therefore strongly contributes to the famous team spirit of the club.
The most recent community activities of the BRC3 included the construction of a new hospital in Boitsfort called “La Clinique des XV Corps”, in Rue de la Pignolle, close to the Foresterie Stadium.

Honours
 Belgian Elite League
 Champions: 1990, 1991, 1992, 1993, 1995, 1997, 1999, 2001, 2002, 2003, 2004, 2005, 2006, 2007, 2008, 2010
 Belgian Cup
 Champions: 1990, 1995, 1996, 1997, 1999, 2002, 2003, 2004, 2005, 2006, 2007, 2008, 2011
 Belgian 2nd Division
 Champions: 1976
 North Sea Cup
 Runners up: 2013

Season by Season

See also
 Rugby union in Belgium
 Belgian Elite League
 Belgian Cup (Rugby Union)

References

Official Website

External links
 Official site

Belgian rugby union clubs
Watermael-Boitsfort